Paul Agostino (born 9 June 1975) is an Australian former professional footballer who played as a forward. He played the majority of his club football outside Australia, most notably with 1860 Munich in Germany for ten years. He played 18 times for Australia, winning the OFC Nations Cup of the year 2000.

Agostino attended Findon High School in his hometown of Adelaide. In 2011, he returned to Munich, where his wife Monika was born, with a view to settle there permanently. There he has since partnered with his former 1860 teammate Roman Týce and opened a soccer school called MunichSoccerCamp.

Club career
Born in Adelaide, Australia, Agostino started his club career at Salisbury United. He on to the national scene in 1991 in his first season at senior level with West Adelaide SC in the NSL. It was at this time that "Aga" was picked in the Australian World Youth Championships squad – a squad which contained the likes of Paul Okon and Mark Bosnich during one of Australia's 'Golden Generations' – which made the semi-finals of that competition.

Overseas
Agostino left for Europe in 1992 and headed for Switzerland, where he signed with Young Boys. Agostino stayed in Bern for two seasons which was invaluable in enabling him to adapt to European life and football. It was in Switzerland that he learnt to speak German which would later help his move to Germany in 1997. He then had a short stint with Yverdon before making the move to England. Agostino signed with Bristol City in 1995 and it was in his second season with Bristol City that he began to score more regularly, bagging 16 goals in the Second Division (the third tier of English club football).

After two productive seasons in Bristol, Agostino's growing reputation caught the eye of Bundesliga side 1860 Munich. He was signed by the club in 1997 at the age of 22. Agostino stayed with the Munich club for a full decade, enduring spells both in and out of the side. Agostino played at the highest level while in Munich, representing 1860 in both the Champions League and the UEFA Cup. He enjoyed his best form for 1860 in the 2000–01 season, scoring 12 goals for the light blues, while Agostino regularly featured in the first team from 1999 to 2002. He fell down the pecking order at 1860 after this and typically played only a handful of games each season until it was revealed that he would be leaving the club on amicable terms at the end of the 2006–07 2. Bundesliga season.

Adelaide United
It was announced in February 2007 that A-League team Adelaide United had agreed on a two-year contract with Agostino which saw him return to his home city for the first time in 15 years. It was announced on 30 December 2008 that Agostino would retire at the end of the 2008–09 season.

International career
Agostino debuted for the Australia national team in 1996 in a match against Chile. In 1996, he was part of the Australia squad for the Olympics in Atlanta, but he was not used in Australia's three matches there. In 1999, he played twice against the Brazil "B" team, scoring two goals. In 2001, Agostino earned the penalty resulting in Australia’s goal in the 1–0 home victory over Uruguay in their ultimately ill-fated World Cup playoff. In 2005, he played versus South Africa for the 18th and last time for the Socceroos. In his 18 full international matches he scored seven goals.

Career statistics

Club

International

Scores and results list Australia's goal tally first, score column indicates score after each Agostino goal.

Honours
Australia
 OFC Nations Cup: 2000

References

External links
 
 OzFootball profile

1975 births
Living people
Soccer players from Adelaide
Association football forwards
Australian soccer players
Australia international soccer players
Olympic soccer players of Australia
A-League Men players
National Soccer League (Australia) players
Bundesliga players
2. Bundesliga players
Swiss Super League players
English Football League players
Salisbury United FC players
Adelaide United FC players
BSC Young Boys players
West Adelaide SC players
TSV 1860 Munich players
Yverdon-Sport FC players
Bristol City F.C. players
Expatriate footballers in Switzerland
Expatriate footballers in Germany
Expatriate footballers in England
Australian expatriate sportspeople in Switzerland
Australian expatriate sportspeople in Germany
Australian expatriate sportspeople in England
Australian expatriate soccer players
Footballers at the 1996 Summer Olympics
2000 OFC Nations Cup players
Marquee players (A-League Men)